The Fourth Seal of Zeen is the fourth studio album by South African gothic rock band The Awakening, released in 2000. The album features the band's most well-known single "The Dark Romantics" as well as the singles "Eve" and "Amethyst" which became both fan and media favourites.  The album is considered one of the band's most popular and most dramatic releases to date.

Track listing
All songs written by Ashton Nyte.
"Precious (A Shard)"
"Stigma"
"Amethyst"
"A Promise of Zeen"
"The Dark Romantics"
"Eve"
"Prophet"
"Zeen"
"The Other Garden"
"Ward"
"The Harmony of Imperfection"
"Missing Chapters"
"Figment"
"Precious"

References

The Awakening (band) albums
2000 albums